Stanley Morgan (born 1955) is a retired American football player who played most of his career for the New England Patriots.

Stanley Morgan may also refer to:

Stanley Morgan (politician) (1870–1951), British clergyman and politician
Stanley Morgan (author) (1929–2018), British author and actor
Stanley Morgan Jr. (born 1996), American football player, currently playing for the Cincinnati Bengals

See also 
Morgan Stanley